Gangneung Gymnasium (강릉실내종합체육관) is a multi-purpose indoor arena, located in the coastal city of Gangneung, South Korea. It was opened in 1998 for ice hockey at the 1999 Asian Winter Games. The seating capacity is 3,500. It is converted into ice surface when needed, while the underground floor is a permanent ice rink.

It was used for the 2009 World Women's Curling Championships, 2013 Special Olympics World Winter Games, 2017 World Junior Curling Championships, and 2017 World Wheelchair Curling Championship. It was used for both the 2018 Winter Olympics and 2018 Winter Paralympics as the venue for curling and wheelchair curling.

It is the only Olympic venue in Gangneung which existed prior to the selection of PyeongChang as host city of the 2018 Winter Games. For the Games it was named the Gangneung Curling Centre (강릉 컬링 센터). It was renovated between October 2015 and October 2016 in preparation for the Games.

Gallery

References

Venues of the 2018 Winter Olympics
Olympic curling venues
Indoor arenas in South Korea
Curling venues in South Korea
Sports venues in Gangneung
1998 establishments in South Korea
Sports venues completed in 1998
20th-century architecture in South Korea